The Silver Pigs is a 1989 historical mystery crime novel by Lindsey Davis and the first book in the Marcus Didius Falco Mysteries series. Set in Rome and Britannia during AD 70, just after the year of the four emperors, the novel stars Marcus Didius Falco, informer and imperial agent. The book's title refers to 200-pound lead ingots "pigs" filled with silver ore and stolen from Roman Britain, which feature prominently in the plot.

Plot summary
This first novel in the Marcus Didius Falco Mysteries series introduces the main characters as well as establishes relationships that continue and grow throughout the series.

Falco stumbles upon a conspiracy in the trading of silver ingots, but not before it claims the life of a young girl (Sosia Camillina) Falco meets and is smitten with. Hired by Sosia's uncle, a senator, to find out who murdered her and by the Roman Emperor Vespasian, to uncover the conspiracy, Falco finds himself on the next boat to Britain.

Once there he meets a lady way out of his class, Helena Justina, the daughter of the Senator who hired him, and Sosia's cousin. At first sight Falco and Helena loathe each other: He hates her class, and she hates his prejudice. Things are made no easier by Sosia's death, especially for Helena. Working under cover, Falco himself working down a silver mine, acting as a mine slave, Falco learns the meaning of hate, pain and abuse. After being rescued by Helena and a friendly centurion, Falco heads back to Rome, as the reluctant charge of the even more reluctant Helena.

After spending so much time together, and many arguments, misunderstandings and denials, Falco and Helena fall in love (and subsequently consummate this in a horse stable, in a public garden). Eventually, Falco sorts out the case and only has to bring the culprits to justice. However, there is no justice, as one of the culprits is Domitian, the Emperor's wayward son, and the only other surviving culprit is very close to Helena and her senator father.

After a final, bloody, retribution is carried out in the climax, Falco is offered a promotion to the equestrian rank. As an equestrian Falco would be upper middle class and could marry Helena without bringing her or her family shame, as would with his current meagre earnings. He refuses, seeing the offer as a bribe to keep the conspiracy hushed-up. After realizing his mistake and how he must have insulted Helena, he returns to Vespasian and asks for the chance again, and while he is told that his name can be added to the equestrian lists, he must first raise the 400,000 sesterces himself in order to purchase the land of that value, which is the qualification for equestrian status. Vespasian came from an equestrian family that rose into the senatorial rank under the Julio–Claudian emperors, and although he fulfilled the standard succession of public offices, he had really made his name and earned his power in military service. Dejected, Falco returns to his dilapidated tenement in the Aventine Hill and there finds Helena waiting for him. She promises to wait for him for as long as it takes.

Characters in The Silver Pigs

In Regio XIII (The Aventine Sector)
 Lenia - A Laundress.
 Lucius Petronius Longus - Member of the Vigiles and friend of Falco.
 Marcia - Daughter of Falco's deceased brother, Festus.
 Marcus Didius Falco - Informer and Imperial Agent from the Aventine.
 Smaractus - Falco's Landlord.

In Regio I (The Capena Gate Sector)
 Decimus Camillus Verus - Senator, father of Helena Justina.
 Gnaeus Atius Pertinax - Aedile, ex-husband of Helena Justina.
 Helena Justina - Daughter of the Senator Decimus Camillus Verus, aged 23 years. Lover of Falco.
 Julia Justa - Mother of Helena Justina.
 Naissa - Maid of Helena Justina
 Publius Camillus Meto - Younger brother of Camillus Verus, engaged in import/export trade.
 Sosia Camillina - Daughter of Meto, aged 16 years.

At the Imperial Palace
 Domitian Caesar - Younger son of the Emperor.
 Titus Caesar - Elder son of the Emperor.
 Vespasian Augustus - Emperor of Rome.

In other parts of Rome
 Astia - Drayman's floosie
 Glaucus - Gymnasium proprietor
 Julius Frontinus - Captain in the Praetorian Guard

In Britain
 Aelia Camilla - Procurator's wife, younger sister of Camillus Verus and Publius.
 Cornix - Mine foreman.
 Gaius Flavius Hilaris - Imperial procurator
 Rufrius Vitalis - Ex-Centurion of the Second Augustan Legion, living in retirement at Isca Dumnoniorum.
 Simplex - Medical officer to the Second Augustan Legion at Glevum.
 T. Claudius Triferus - Holder of the contract to manage the Imperial silver mine at Vebiodunum.

Major themes

 Investigation into possible treason involving the imperial silver mines.
 Developing relationship of Marcus Didius Falco and Helena Justina.
 The influence of family relationships and of wealth in political affairs

Awards and nominations
 Winner of the Author's Club First Novel Award in 1989.

Adaptations in other media
  Radio drama, starring Anton Lesser and Fritha Goodey

Release details
  (In this new introduction by the author, Davis comments that some corrections have been made and mentions recent research suggesting that the 'pigs' may not have been formed in the way previously thought, but 'it's possible that when Falco describes the process to Petronius, he is wrong.') 
 
 
  OCLC Number: 317850415.

References

External links
 lindseydavis.co.uk, Author's Official Website

1989 British novels
Marcus Didius Falco novels
Novels set in Roman Britain
70
Historical mystery novels
Sidgwick & Jackson books